Jacoba Surie (5 September 1879 – 5 February 1970) was a Dutch painter.

Surie was born in Amsterdam and trained at the Rijksakademie van beeldende kunsten there, where she studied  under Joseph Mendes da Costa. She was a member of Arti et Amicitiae and the Pulchri Studio. She is considered one of the Amsterdamse Joffers. Her work was also part of the painting event in the art competition at the 1928 Summer Olympics.

Surie died in Amsterdam and was buried in Zorgvlied.

Her work is in the collections of the Stedelijk Museum Amsterdam, Gemeentemuseum Den Haag and Gemeentemuseum Helmond.

References

 Jacoba Surie on artnet

1879 births
1970 deaths
Painters from Amsterdam
Dutch women painters
20th-century Dutch painters
20th-century Dutch women artists
Olympic competitors in art competitions